Åsane is a neighbourhood in the city of Kristiansand in Agder county, Norway. The neighborhood is located in the borough of Vågsbygd and in the district of Vågsbygd. The Åsane Elementary School serves the neighborhood.  Åsane is north of Bråvann, south of Nordtjønnåsen, and west of Bjørklia.

Transportation

References

Geography of Kristiansand
Neighbourhoods of Kristiansand